The 2008 IAAF World Half Marathon Championships were held in Rio de Janeiro, Brazil on 12 October 2008.

This event was first announced as the 2008 IAAF World Road Running Championships, but in November 2007, the IAAF announced that the name of the IAAF World Road Running Championships would revert to its original title of the IAAF World Half Marathon Championships.

Detailed reports on the event and an appraisal of the results were given both
for the men's race and for the women's race.

Medallists

Race results
Complete results were published for the men's race, for the women's race, for men's team, and for women's team.

Men's

Women's

Team results

Men's

Women's

Participation
The participation of 155 athletes (90 men/65 women) from 42 countries is reported.  Although announced, athletes from  did not show.

 (8)
 (2)
 (2)
 (3)
 (10)
 (1)
 (1)
 (2)
 (1)
 (2)
 (2)
 (3)
 (5)
 (10)
 (6)
 (1)
 (9)
 (9)
 (2)
 (4)
 (1)
 (1)
 (1)
 (2)
 (2)
 (1)
 (3)
 (5)
 (4)
 (8)
 (4)
 (7)
 (5)
 (1)
 (1)
 (1)
 (2)
 (2)
 (10)
 (2)
 (8)
 (1)

See also
 2008 in athletics (track and field)

References

External links
iaaf.org - IAAF/CIAXA World Half Marathon Championships - Rio 2008

World Half Marathon Championships
World Athletics Half Marathon Championships
International sports competitions in Rio de Janeiro (city)
Iaaf World Half Marathon Championships, 2008
International athletics competitions hosted by Brazil
Athletics in Rio de Janeiro (city)
October 2008 sports events in South America